The Federal State Statistics Service (Federal'naya sluzhba gosudarstvennoi statistiki (Rosstat)) is the governmental statistics agency in Russia.

Since 2017, it is again part of the Ministry of Economic Development, having switched several times in the previous decades between that ministry and being directly controlled by the federal government.

History
Goskomstat (Gosudarstvennyi komitet po statistike, or, in English, the State Committee for Statistics) was the centralised agency dealing with statistics in the Soviet Union. Goskomstat was created in 1987 to replace the Central Statistical Administration, while maintaining the same basic functions in the collection, analysis, publication and distribution of state statistics, including economic, social and population statistics. This renaming amounted to a formal demotion of the status of the agency.

In addition to overseeing the collection and evaluation of state statistics, Goskomstat (and its predecessors) was responsible for planning and carrying out the population and housing censuses. It carried out seven such censuses, in 1926, 1937, 1939, 1959, 1970, 1979 and 1989.

House No. 39, on Ulitsa Myasnitskaya, Tsentrosoyuz building, home to Goskomstat, was designed by the Swiss-born architect Le Corbusier.

References

External links 
 Official website 
 Official website  
 Interstate Statistical Committee of the Commonwealth of Independent States

Government agencies of Russia
Economy of the Soviet Union
Government of the Soviet Union
1987 establishments in the Soviet Union
State Committees of the Soviet Union
National statistical services
Demographics of the Soviet Union